Petroscirtes xestus, the xestus sabretooth blenny, xestus fangblenny, or the bearded sabretooth blenny, is a species of combtooth blenny found in coral reefs in the Pacific and Indian Ocean.  This species reaches a length of  TL.

References

xestus
Fish described in 1906
Taxa named by David Starr Jordan
Taxa named by Alvin Seale